Julien Bègue (8 August 1993) is a French footballer who plays as a winger for Championnat National 2 side Louhans-Cuiseaux. He previously played in Ligue 1 for Guingamp and in Romania with Astra Giurgiu.

Honours
Astra Giurgiu
Cupa României: Runner-up 2018–19

References

External links

1993 births
Sportspeople from Saint-Denis, Réunion
Living people
French footballers
French people of Réunionnais descent
Association football midfielders
Ligue 1 players
Ligue 2 players
Championnat National players
Championnat National 2 players
En Avant Guingamp players
US Boulogne players
Football Bourg-en-Bresse Péronnas 01 players
Le Mans FC players
Louhans-Cuiseaux FC players
Liga I players
FC Astra Giurgiu players
French expatriate footballers
French expatriate sportspeople in Romania
Expatriate footballers in Romania